Ega or EGA may refer to:

Military
 East German Army, the common western name for the National People's Army
 Eagle, Globe, and Anchor, the emblem of the United States Marine Corps

People 
 Aega (mayor of the palace), 7th-century noble of Neustria and Burgundy
 Françoise Ega (1920–1976), Afro-Martinican laborer, writer and social activist

Places 
 Egå, a suburban area of Aarhus, Denmark
 Ega, Portugal, a parish of Condeixa-a-Nova
 Ega (river), in Spain
 Tefé, formerly Ega, a city and a municipality in Brazil

Technology 
 Enhanced Graphics Adapter, an IBM PC computer display standard from 1984

Other uses 
 Ecuato Guineana, a defunct Equatoguinean airline
 Ega language
 Egyptian German Automotive Company, an Egyptian automobile manufacturer
 Elegant Gothic Aristocrat, a fashion line
 Éléments de géométrie algébrique, a mathematical treatise by Alexander Grothendieck and Jean Dieudonné
 Embroiderers' Guild of America, 
 European Golf Association
 Evolved gas analysis
 Ega (beetle), a genus of ground beetles in the family Carabidae

See also
 Ega long-tongued bat (Scleronycteris ega)